Mahendra Prasad (8 January 1940 – 27 December 2021) was an Indian politician from Janata Dal (United) party, a Member of the Parliament of India representing Bihar in the Rajya Sabha. He was the richest Indian MP. Prasad also owned two pharmaceutical companies, Aristo Pharmaceuticals and Mapra Laboratories Pvt Ltd. He died at Apollo Hospital in Delhi on 27 December 2021, at the age of 81.

Personal life
Prasad was born at Govindpur village in the modern Indian state of Bihar. He belonged to Bhumihar family. He was married to Satula Devi and had 3 sons Rajiv Sharma, Ranjit Sharma and late Devinder.

Career
Prasad moved out of his home at the age of 24. At young age he left for Bombay to start a business. He worked as a teacher in a school.He started working with pharma businessman Samprada Singh. He later went on to start his company Aristo Pharmaceuticals in 1971. He started his political career in 1980 when he was elected to Lok Sabha on a congress ticket. He was a seven term MP from Bihar who was also once elected to Lok Sabha. He also owned two pharmaceutical companies named Aristo Pharmaceuticals and Mapra Laboratories Pvt Ltd.

References

External links
 Profile on Rajya Sabha website

1940 births
2021 deaths
India MPs 1980–1984
Businesspeople from Bihar
Janata Dal (United) politicians
Lok Sabha members from Bihar
Rajya Sabha members from Bihar